Aydat is a commune in the Puy-de-Dôme department in Auvergne-Rhône-Alpes in central France. The Lac d'Aydat is located in the commune.

Population

See also
 Communes of the Puy-de-Dôme department
 Ponteix, Saskatchewan, named after Le Ponteix, a hamlet of Aydat commune.

References

Communes of Puy-de-Dôme